The David di Donatello for Best Short Film is a category in the David di Donatello Awards, described as "Italy’s answer to the Oscars", presented annually by the Accademia del Cinema Italiano (ACI, Academy of Italian Cinema) to recognize the most outstanding Italian short film released in Italy during the year preceding the ceremony, starting with the 1997 edition.

Winners and nominees
Winners are indicated in bold.

1990s
1997
 Senza parole, by Antonello De Leo

1998
 La matta dei fiori, by Rolando Stefanelli
 Asino chi legge, by Pietro Reggiani
 Spalle al muro, by Nina Di Maio

1999
 Quasi fratelli, by Francesco Falaschi
 Fuochino, by Carlotta Cerquetti
 Incantesimo napoletano, by Paolo Genovese and Luca Miniero
 Tanti auguri, by Giulio Manfredonia

2000s
2000
 Monna Lisa, by Matteo Delbò

2001
 Gavetta, by Craig Bell
 Cecchi Gori Cecchi Gori?, by Rocco Papaleo

2002
 Non dire gatto, by Giorgio Tirabassi
 La storia chiusa, by Emiliano Corapi
 Un paio di occhiali, by Carlo Damasco

2003
 Racconto di guerra, by Mario Amura (ex aequo)
 Rosso fango, by Paolo Ameli (ex aequo)
 Radioportogutenberg, by Alessandro Vannucci
 Regalo di Natale, by Daniele De Plano
 Space off, by Tino Franco

2004
 Sole, by Michele Carrillo (ex aequo)
 Zinanà, by Pippo Mezzapesa (ex aequo)
 Aspettando il treno, by Catherine Mc Gilvray
 Interno 9, by Davide Del Degan
 Un amore possibile, by Amanda Sandrelli

2005
 Aria, by Claudio Noce (ex aequo)
 Lotta libera, by Stefano Viali (ex aequo)
 Mio fratello Yang, by Gianluca e Massimiliano De Serio
 O' guarracino, by Michelangelo Fornaro
 Un refolo, by Giovanni Arcangeli

2006
 Un inguaribile amore, by Giovanni Covini
 Codice a sbarre, by Ivano De Matteo
 Dentro Roma, by Francesco Costabile
 Tanalibera tutti, by Vito Palmieri
 Zakaria, by Gianluca and Massimiliano De Serio

2007
 Meridionali senza filtro, by Michele Bia
 Armando, by Massimiliano Camaiti
 La cena di Emmaus, by Josè Corvaglia
 Solo cinque minuti, by Filippo Soldi
 Travaglio, by Lele Biscussi

2008
 Uova, by Alessandro Celli
 Adil & Yusuf, by Claudio Noce
 Il bambino di Carla, by Emanuela Rossi
 Ora che Marlene, by Giovanna Nazarena Silvestri
 Tramondo, by Giacomo Agnetti and Davide Bazzali

2009
 L'arbitro, by Paolo Zucca
 L'amore è un gioco, by Andrea Rovetta
 Bisesto, by Giovanni Esposito and Francesco Prisco
 Cicatrici, by Eros Achiardi
 La Madonna della frutta, by Paolo Randi

2010s
2010
 Passing Time, by Laura Bispuri
 L'altra metà, by Pippo Mezzapesa
 Buonanotte, by Riccardo Banfi
 Nuvole, mani, by Simone Massi
 Uerra, by Paolo Sassanelli

2011
 Jody delle giostre, by Adriano Sforzi
 Io sono qui, by Mario Piredda
 Caffè Capo, by Andrea Zaccariello
 Salvatore, by Bruno Urso and Fabrizio Urso
 Stand By Me, by Giuseppe Marco Albano

2012
 Dell'ammazzare il maiale, by Simone Massi
 Ce l'hai un minuto?, by Alessandro Bardani and Luca Di Prospero
 Cusutu n' coddu - Cucito addosso, by Giovanni La Pàrola
 L'estate che non viene, by Pasquale Marino
 Tiger Boy, by Gabriele Mainetti

2013
 L'esecuzione, by Enrico Iannaccone
 Ammore, by Paolo Sassanelli
 Cargo, by Carlo Sironi
 Preti, by Astutillo Smeriglia
 Settanta, by Pippo Mezzapesa

2014
 37°4 S, by Adriano Valerio
 A passo d'uomo, by Giovanni Aloi
 Bella di notte, by Paolo Zucca
 Lao, by Gabriele Sabatino Nardis
 Non sono nessuno, by Francesco Segrè

2015
 Thriller, by Giuseppe Marco Albano
 Due piedi sinistri, by Isabella Salvetti
 L'errore, by Brando De Sica
 Sinuaria, by Roberto Carta

2016
 Bellissima, by Alessandro Capitani
 A metà luce, by Anna Gigante
 Dove l'acqua con altra acqua si confonde, by Gianluca Mangiasciutti and Massimo Loi
 La ballata dei senzatetto, by Monica Manganelli
 Per Anna, by Andrea Zuliani

2017
 A casa mia, by Mario Piredda
 Ego, by Lorenza Indovina
 Mostri, by Adriano Giotti
 Simposio suino in re minore, by Francesco Filippini
 Viola, Franca, by Marta Savina2018 Bismillah, by Alessandro Grande
 Confino, by Nico Bonomolo
 La Giornata, by Pippo Mezzapesa
 Mezzanotte Zero Zero, by Nicola Conversa
 Pazzo & Bella, by Marcello Di Noto2019 Frontiera, by Alessandro Di Gregorio
 Il nostro concerto, by Francesco Piras
 Im Bären, by Lilian Sassanelli
 Magic Alps, by Andrea Brusa and Marco Scotuzzi
 Yousef, by Mohamed Hossameldin

2020s
2020
 Inverno, by Giulio Mastromauro
 Baradar, by Beppe Tufarulo
 Il nostro tempo, by Veronica Spedicati
 Mia sorella, by Saverio Cappiello
 Unfolded, by Cristina Picchi

References

External links
 
 David di Donatello official website

David di Donatello
Short film awards